No Limit is a French television action-adventure series created by filmmaker Luc Besson with Franck Philippon through Besson's EuropaCorp company. Along with Transporter: The Series, it represents one of Besson's first forays into television, although this time as a writer as well as a producer.

The series follows Vincent Libérati, played by Vincent Elbaz, a DGSE agent plagued with an incurable disease who accepts an offer from a mysterious secret organization to perform missions on French soil in exchange for an experimental treatment, which brings him closer to his temperamental teenage daughter Lola, his ex-wife Alexandra, and his suspicious cop sister Juliette.

No Limit premiered in Belgium on RTL-TVI on November 5, 2012 and ten days later in France on TF1. A second and third season were confirmed on November 29, before the French airing of the first season's last two episodes.  International broadcast rights are held by TF1 International.

Plot
A potentially fatal brain tumor forces Vincent Libérati to abandon the glamour of a globetrotting secret agent's life and return to Marseille to be close to his teen daughter Lola and ex-wife Alexandra. In order to receive an experimental medical treatment, Vincent agrees to join Hydra, a confidential organization set up by secret services to fight organized crime on the French Riviera with illegal means. Meanwhile, his personal life isn't rosy either as he still isn't over Alexandra and is still trying to figure out Lola.

Cast

Main characters
 Vincent Elbaz as Vincent Libérati, the protagonist, a French covert agent recently diagnosed with a brain tumor who relocates to Marseille to be closer to his estranged family, who know nothing about his illness or his job and believe him to be a burglar alarm installer.
 Anne Girouard as Commissioner Juliette Lambert, Vincent's sister, a homicide detective recently posted in Marseille who ironically suffers from a devastating pollen allergy and whose investigations often cross paths with Vincent's missions.
 Hélène Seuzaret as Alexandra, Vincent's ex-wife who he is still in love with but who is getting ready to remarry.
 Sarah Brannens as Lola Libérati, Vincent's 15-year-old daughter who isn't ready to forgive him for not being there when she was growing up.
 Christian Brendel as Colonel De Boissieu, the officer in charge of Hydra, the secret organization Vincent Libérati works for.

Recurring characters

 Philippe Hérisson as Bertrand Rey, Alexandra's fiancé who is revealed (in the season one finale) to be secretly working for Hydra as their money-laundering expert.
 Vanessa Guide as Marie Dulac, a covert agent colleague of Vincent's, who is also romantically attracted to him.
 Damien Jouillerot as Tony Massart, a small-time crook who reluctantly befriends and helps Vincent.
 Franck de la Personne as Professor Grimberg
 Samir Boitard as Reda
 Makita Samba as Arthur Lefranc
 Jean-Marie Paris as Bouly
 Vanessa Guide as Marie Dulac
 Véronique Kapoyan as Commandant Nadine Leroy
 Martin Darlan as Virgile
 Mylène Demongeot as Christine Libérati
 Philippe Nahon as Victor Cerda
 Patrick Chesnais as Claude (Season 3)
 Claude Brasseur as Brunetti (Season 3)

Episodes

Season 1 (2012)

Season 2 (2013)

Season 3 (2015)

Production

Conception
French channel TF1 had been asking Luc Besson to create a TV show for them since 2005, but the filmmaker kept turning them down due to his unfamiliarity with television, which is also the reason he sold the rights for Transporter: The Series. However, the desire to penetrate the television market engrained itself in Besson's mind and in April 2010, his company EuropaCorp acquired Cipango, a profitable production company specialized in television, with produced shows such as Les Bleus and the international co-production XIII. No Limit is the first series to come out of a September 2011 deal between the company, rebranded EuropaCorp Television, and TF1. Based on an original idea by Luc Besson, the series was co-created with screenwriter Franck Philippon, whose first feature, À ton image, was produced by EuropaCorp, and was announced by TF1 on April 6, 2012. According to Philippon, the ambition was to show things that had never been seen in a French show, and surprise the viewer. The creators started out wanting to tell the story of a father and his daughter, injected with a mix of action and comedy and Philippon added that the challenge, and the show's strength, was that balance of action, comedic and emotional moments.

The show was titled after the discipline of No-Limits Apnea. Diving holds a special place in Luc Besson's heart, whose parents were scuba diving instructors, and who had planned to become a marine biologist himself before a diving accident ended those plans and whose third film, The Big Blue, was all about the subject. In addition, the title was meant to give the show an international-sounding name in order to widen its appeal and was also a reference to the state of the hero, who is afflicted with a brain tumor. The writers took inspiration from other TV shows to portray the condition, chief among them Breaking Bad.

Producer Thomas Anargyros revealed the season's budget to be 9 million euros, which is about 30% higher than TF1's usual productions and 50% than the French average. The show is one of several ambitious new shows commissioned by TF1, along with Falco and the English-language series Jo, Crossing Lines and Taxi Brooklyn that showcase the channel's desire to become a bigger player in the international market and a change in French channels' conception of TV shows.

Format
For the first season, each mission lasts two episodes, which is also the pace at which the directors rotate. The typical episode lasts slightly more than 50 minutes, with the exception of the pilot episode which is nearly 70 minutes long. The series has been described as being very much in line with the rest of Luc Besson's oeuvre, with important means and much impressive action mixed with comedy.

The second season featured a single story arc.

Casting

No Limit represents Vincent Elbaz's first regular role in a TV series and his performance was widely touted in the media as one of the highlights of the show. The 41-year-old actor was dubious about how the show could compare to similar American productions, but was sold thanks to Luc Besson's involvement and the ambition of the project. He described his role as "James Bond with daily problems" and his character as particularly complex, due to his lies eating him up inside but also provoking hilarious scenes. Elbaz drew inspiration from Bruce Willis' performance in Die Hard and had to train intensively for the role, learning Pencak Silat and Krav Maga, and confront his fear of heights, as he insisted on performing the majority of his own stunts. He said it was the first time he had been offered such a role and that though he believes television can never reach the level of cinema, he does not think he has ever seen anything like No Limit on French television.

On the other hand, the show marks the second lead role in a TV series for Anne Girouard, after six years of portraying Guinevere in the successful Arthurian comedy Kaamelott. Several media outlets singled out the 36-year-old's performance as one of the show's strengths. The actress was pregnant throughout the shoot and thus unable to partake in some of the more demanding action scenes, much to her frustration.

Nineteen-year-old Sarah Brannens was chosen to portray Elbaz's fifteen-year-old daughter in the show. Her casting was heavily hyped in the media as Luc Besson's latest female revelation after Natalie Portman, Anne Parillaud, Milla Jovovich and Marion Cotillard. The relationship between Brannens' and Elbaz's characters in one of the core elements of the show. Coincidentally, Brannens was also cast in a role on the procedural Main Courante which premiered the day after No Limit on competing channel France 2.

Damien Jouillerot's character Tony Massart was originally scheduled to appear only in the first two episodes and die, but the actor impressed the producers so much they decided to write him into the subsequent episodes.

Season 1

Filming
Shooting commenced on April 9, 2012, in Marseille at 3:30 AM and lasted four-and-a-half months until mid-August of that year. Filming was entirely conducted in the Marseille region, including the Mali-set opening scene of the first episode which was shot on the Vitrolles plateau. The first two episodes were shot in two weeks while the next four took twelve days. The six episodes were directed by veteran TV helmers Didier Le Pêcheur and Julien Despaux. Le Pêcheur directed the first two and final two episodes, while Despaux helmed the middle two and served as second unit director on the first two. Cinematography was handled by Ludovic Colbeau-Justin, who had previously collaborated with Le Pêcheur on the TV shows Les Bleus and La Commanderie. The production designer for the season was Jean-Jacques Gernolle, who had worked with EuropaCorp before on the first two Taxi films and Wasabi.  The show's numerous stunts were handled by Alain Figlarz and his team, who had previously worked on projects such as The Bourne Identity, Taken 2, 36 Quai des Orfèvres and Brotherhood of the Wolf. Figlarz was additionally the second unit director for the last four episodes and Vincent Elbaz woke up each morning at 6 AM to train with him. According to Le Pêcheur, Luc Besson didn't involve himself much with the production, only sporadically giving his comments and approval during the shoot and post-production.

The series was mostly shot on location, with the notable exception of the Hydra headquarters, which were built in a studio and specifically designed for long steadicam shots. In addition, EuropaCorp obtained the collaboration of the French Armed Forces and was thus able to shoot in several military locations, including the interior of a frigate, which doubled as a submarine.

Post-production
The first two episodes were edited by Christine Lucas Navarro, who has worked on numerous EuropaCorp productions including Taken, the first two Transporter films and Angel-A, with Olivier Gourlay, as a co-editor on the first two episodes who worked on films such as Alexander, Gothika, Harry, He's Here to Help and Days of Glory. Yves Beloniak a frequent collaborator of director Didier Le Pêcheur and César-nominee for his work on La Vie en Rose edited the following two episodes while Christine Lucas Navarro was the sole editor on the last two.

Visual effects were handled by Thierry Delobel who had previously worked on projects such as Amélie, The Fall, A Very Long Engagement and Asterix & Obelix: Mission Cleopatra.

The show's score was composed by Erwann Kermorvant, best known for his collaborations with Olivier Marchal on 36 Quai des Orfèvres and Les Lyonnais as well as the scores for I Do and the TV series R.I.S, police scientifique.

Sound mixing was completed on October 20, 2012.

Season 2
The second season was already being written prior to the first season's debut, with Vincent Elbaz unwilling to commit before reading the scripts and the writers aiming to delve more into the characters' past. It was officially greenlit along with the third season on November 29, 2012, will consist of eight episodes and will start shooting in spring 2013 for an expected fall 2013 broadcast.

Reception

Critical response
The press screening for the first season occurred on October 24, 2012. Reception for the show has been generally positive, with many critics praising in particular Vincent Elbaz's performance but lamenting the uneven and unbelievable scripts.

Writing for the Belgian weekly Moustique, Geneviève de Wergifosse gave the show a mixed review, leaning towards the positive, and awarded a score of two stars out of four, criticizing the unbelievable plot but singling out the casting of Vincent Elbaz, Anne Girouard's performance, the cinematography and the "macho" directing. In L'Express, Sandra Benedetti also praised Elbaz and Girouard's acting as well as Damien Jouillerot's, noted Didier Le Pêcheur's "incredibly efficient" directing and singled out the fifth episode as the show's highlight. She however also criticized the plot as well as Julien Despaux's directing. Elbaz's acting and the directing were also praised by Corinne Calmet in Télé Z, who added that not a second of the show was boring. In Télé 7 Jours, Isabelle Magnier was also impressed by Elbaz and deemed that the show held its promises, though she also felt the plot required a strong suspension of disbelief while in Le Figaro, Nathalie Chuc opined that No Limit worked pretty well and was efficient, while comparing the directing favorably to 24.

One of the more negative reviews came from Adrien Maillard in Le Nouvel Observateur who felt the show was disappointing, the premise unoriginal, the action scenes dull and the dialogues flat.

Ratings

Prior to the French broadcast, creator Luc Besson confessed being slightly afraid, rationalizing that "in a movie hall, the audience doesn't have a remote control to change the channel". However his fears proved to be unfounded as the show was a major success for TF1, who revealed that it had the highest rated premiere for a program on Thursday evenings since 2010.

Broadcast history
No Limit premiered in Belgium on RTL-TVI on November 5, 2012, where it is scheduled to complete its run in three weeks at a pace of two episodes per night. In France, the crew premiered the show in Marseille, where the series is set, at the cinema "Les 3 Palmes" three days later on November 8. The star-studded Parisian premiere took place on November 13 at the cinema "UGC George V" on the Champs-Elysées and the show started broadcasting on November 15 for three weeks on TF1, at a pace of two episodes per night in prime time on Thursdays.

In Thailand first aired on digital television MONO29 on October 25, 2015.

In Australia, SBS broadcast series one and two, starting on 10 January 2015.

See also
 List of French television series

References

External links
  at TF1.fr
 

2010s French television series
2012 French television series debuts
French-language television shows
French crime television series
French action television series
Spy thriller television series
French action adventure television series
TF1 original programming
RTL-TVI original programming